"Something in the Air" is a song by Thunderclap Newman.

Something in the Air may also refer to:

Film and television
Something in the Air (2002 film), a Brazilian film directed by Helvécio Ratton
Something in the Air (2012 film), a French film directed by Olivier Assayas
Something in the Air (TV series), an Australian soap opera

Music
Something in the Air (album) or the title song, by Lila McCann, 1999
"Something in the Air", a song by David Bowie from Hours
"Something in the Air", a song by Information Society from Information Society